Dendrobium gratiosissimum, the very graceful dendrobium, is a species of orchid. It is native to Thailand, Vietnam, Laos, Myanmar, Yunnan, and Assam.

References

gratiosissimum
Flora of Indo-China
Flora of the Indian subcontinent
Orchids of Yunnan
Plants described in 1865